Wolfgang Suppan (5 August 1933 – 4 May 2015) was an Austrian musicologist. He is the father of the wind musician and composer Armin Suppan.

Career 
In 1959, he was awarded a Dr. phil. In 1961, he went to Freiburg im Breisgau as a scholarship holder of the Deutsche Forschungsgemeinschaft, first to the Institute for East German Folklore, and since 1963 to the Deutsches Volksliedarchiv as a musicological consultant. In 1971, he received his habilitation for musicology at the University of Mainz. In 1974, he accepted a call to the Institute for Music Ethnology at the University of Music and Performing Arts Graz. Assistant professorships took him to the University of Göttingen in 1991/92, to Innsbruck in 1992/93 and to Salzburg in 1991/92 and 1996/97. He has also held lectureships and guest professorships at the Institute for Music Pedagogy at the University of Frankfurt, at the Aarhus University, the Columbia University, the University of Texas at Austin, among others, and the Bar-Ilan University. He retired in 2001.

Boards 
He was a member of the Presidium of the Deutscher Musikrat from 1973 to 1978 and of the ISME Research Commission from 1975 to 1981. His main areas of work included the anthropology of music, European ethnomusicology, brass music research and the history of music in Austria. From 1996 to 2006, he was also the head of the Styrian Brass Music Association.

Suppan died in Graz at the age of 79.

Awards 
 1978: Großes Ehrenzeichen des Landes Steiermark
 1984: Forschungspreis des Landes Steiermark
 1994: Bundesverdienstkreuz I. Klasse des Verdienstordens der Bundesrepublik Deutschland
 1994: Decoration of Honour for Services to the Republic of Austria
 Honorary citizen of Pürgg-Trautenfels

Publications

Books 
 Steirisches Musiklexikon. Graz 1962–1966.
 Volkslied. Seine Sammlung und Erforschung. Stg. 1966
 Otto Siegl. Eine Studie. Vienna 1966.
 Deutsches Liedleben zwischen Renaissance und Barock. Habilitationsschrift Mainz 1971, gedruckt Tutzing 1973.
 Das neue Lexikon des Blasmusikwesens (mit Armin Suppan). Schulz, Freiburg 1973. .
 Jenö Takács. Dokumente, Analysen, Kommentare. Eisenstadt 1977.
 Der musizierende Mensch. Eine Anthropologie der Musik. Schott, Mainz 1983, .
 Blasmusik in Baden. Musikverlag Schulz, Freiburg 1983, .
 Musica humana. Die anthropologische und kulturethologische Dimension der Musikwissenschaft. Vienna among others. 1986, .
 Komponieren für Amateure. Tutzing 1987, .
 Texte und Melodien der "Erlauer Spiele". Tutzing 1990 (with J. Janota).
 Werk und Wirkung. Musikwissenschaft als Menschen- und Kulturgüterforschung. 3 volumes, Tutzing 2000.
 Blasmusikland Steiermark. Gnas/Steiermark 2003, .
 Blasmusikforschung Bibliographie 1966–2003. Schneider, Tutzing 2003.
 Steirisches Musiklexikon. 2nd, completely revised and extended edition; Akademische Druck- und Verlagsanstalt, Graz 2009, .
 Blasmusik in der Steiermark. Musik klingt und berührt die Herzen. Ein Beitrag zur landeskundlichen Musikforschung, Weishaupt-Verlag, Gnas 2010, .
 An der Wiege des Landes Steiermark. Die Chronik Pürgg-Trautenfels. Mit Beiträgen von Gottfried Allmer, Walter Brunner, Wilhelm Deuer, Josef Hasitschka, Ingo Mirsch, Hannes P. Naschenweng, Armin und Wolfgang Suppan.  Weishaupt-Verlag, Gnas/Steiermark 2013, .

Editions 
 Deutsche Volkslieder mit ihren Melodien. Balladen. Vol. 5 and 6, Freiburg im Breisgau 1967 and 1976 (with R. W. Brednich, W. Heiske).
 Gottscheer Volkslieder. Gesamtausgabe, 3 volumes, Mainz 1969, 1972 and 1984 (with R. W. Brednich).
 Die Ebermannstädter Liederhandschrift. Kulmbach 1972 (with R. W. Brednich).
 Handbuch des Volksliedes. 2 volumes, München 1973 und 1975 (with R. W. Brednich and L. Röhrich).
 Alta musica. Eine Publikation der Internationalen Gesellschaft zur Erforschung und Förderung der Blasmusik. 23 volumes, Tutzing 1976–2002 (with E. Brixel).
 Melodietypen des deutschen Volksgesanges. Vol. 1, Tutzing 1976 (with W. Stief).
 Liszt-Studien. VOl. 1, Kgr.Ber. Eisenstadt 1975, Graz 1977.
 Musikethnologische Sammelbände. 19 volumes, Graz/Tutzing 1977–2004.
 Goethe. Heidenröslein[-Vertonungen]. 2 volumes, Tokio 1987 (with H. Sakanishi).
 Musica Pannonica. 4 volumes, Oberschützen – Budapest 1991–2000 (with Z. Falvy).

Notes 
 J. J. Fux, Pulcheria, in J.-J.-Fux-Gesamtausgabe V/2, Kassel etc. 1967 (with H. Federhofer).
 E. von Lannoy, Grand Trio für Klar., Vc. nd Kl., L. 1970.
 I. Pleyel, 6 Duette für zwei Klar., Wolfenbüttel 1973.
 W. A. Mozart, 6 Duos für zwei Klar., KV Anh. 159f., Freiburg im Breisgau 1982

Articles 
 Die Lage der Volksmusikforschung in den deutschsprachigen Ländern. In AMl. Vol. 37, 1965,  (with F. Hoerburger).
 Zur Musik der „Erlauer Spiele“. In SM. Vol. 11, 1969, .
 Bürgerliches und bäuerliches Musizieren in Mittelalter und früher Neuzeit. In Musikgeschichte Österreichs. Vol.1, Graz among others 1977, .
 Musikethnologische Forschungen auf den Färöer-Inseln. In AMl. Vol. 49, 1977, .
 Franz Liszt – zwischen F. von Hausegger und E. Hanslick. In SM. vol. 24, 1982, .
 Musikforschung in und für Japan. In AMl. Vol. 54, 1982, .
 Biologische Voraussetzungen und Grenzen kultureller Traditionsbildung. In Traditiones. Band 19, Ljubljana 1990, .
 Ansätze und Ideen zur Anthropologie der Musik. In Orbis Musicae. Vol. 10: Essays in Honor of Hanoch Avenary. Tel Aviv 1990/91, .
 Die Pittsburgh Ouverture (1967) by K. Penderecki. In Contexts of Musicology. Vol. 1: Dedicated to Jan Stęszewski, Poznán 1997, .
 Early Ideas in the Anthropology of Music. In Studies in Socio-Musicology Sciences. George Herzog in Memoriam. Ramat Gan (Tel-Aviv) 1998, .
 La Antropología Musical: Informe sobre sus objetivos y trabajos de investigación. In AnM. Vol. 53, Barcelona 1998, .
 Bläsermusik an den Zentren fürstlicher und städtischer Musikpflege in Renaissance und Barock im südwestdeutsch-alemannischen Raum. In Annales. Vol. 2, Tutzing 2001, .
 Die Funktion der Musik im Leben der Bürger und Bauern Tirols im Mittelalter und in der beginnenden Neuzeit. In Musikgeschichte Tirols. Innsbruck 2001, .
 Benjamin Rajeczky und die historische Volksmusikforschung. In SM. Vol. 42, 2001, .
 Musik als Identifikator. In Musik als … Ausgewählte Betrachtungsweisen. Edited by R. Flotzinger, Veröffentlichungen der Kommission für Musikforschung der Österreichischen Akademie der Wissenschaften, Vol. 28, Vienna 2006, .
 Johann Joseph Fux zu Wolfgang Amadeus Mozart. In Jahresgabe der J.-J.-Fux-Gesellschaft. Vol. 17, Graz 1994

Further reading 
 Bernhard Habla (ed.): Festschrift zum 60. Geburtstag von W. Suppan. Tutzing 1993 (with list of publications).
 Zoltán Falvy: Zum Geleit. In W. Suppan: Werk und Wirkung. vol. 1, Tutzing 2000, 
 … a deeper understanding of all music. Wolfgang Suppan zum 75. Geburtstag (Grazer Beiträge zur Ethnomusikologie, Vol. 23, edit. by Gerd Grupe), Aachen 2010

References

External links 
 
 Publikationsverzeichnis Wolfgang Suppan auf der Website der Historischen Landeskommission für Steiermark

20th-century Austrian musicologists
Academic staff of the University of Music and Performing Arts Graz
University of Graz alumni
Officers Crosses of the Order of Merit of the Federal Republic of Germany
1933 births
2015 deaths
People from Styria